In the first edition of the tournament, Katia Piccolini won the title by defeating Silvia Farina 6–2, 6–3 in the final.

Seeds

Draw

Finals

Top half

Bottom half

References

External links
 Official results archive (ITF)
 Official results archive (WTA)

WTA San Marino
WTA San Marino